Private Crimes  (Delitti privati) is a 1993 Italian mystery mini television series directed by Sergio Martino.

Plot
The story, set in Lucca, sees the death of a businessman, Marco Pierboni, killed in the garden of his villa outside the city, even if the body is found near the factory who ran while a young girl studying in a conservatory, Sandra Durani, disappears and is later found dead near the bank of the river Serchio as a witness of the murder. At the same time begin to circulate in the city a series of anonymous letters, creating a climate of suspicion in the investigation that involves some people who direct and those who only marginally so far were above all suspicion, and even a third is killed person, Paolo Roversi, a friend of Sandra who was looking for items to be acquitted of double murder.

In response to these crimes Nicole Venturi, a French journalist and mother of Sandra, follow closely with colleague Andrea Baresi the survey coordinated by the Police Commissioner Stefano Avanzo and begins to be idea about the identity of the murderer until you get to see a sad truth to kill the daughter and the contractor was severe Scali, villa Pierboni's governess and best friend of Nicole, to avenge the death of daughter Nina, who committed suicide because it ignores Marco Pierboni with whom she had an affair, while the third murder committed by the housekeeper, too, was due to the fact that Paolo Roversi had suspected something about the theft of paintings took place in the villa outside the city.

Immediately after the confession of severity, Nicole will also discover the author of anonymous letters, ten in all, except the last, written by Dr. Guido Braschi in a desperate attempt to save another pain to Matilde Pierboni the other nine letters were indeed written by Filippo Pierboni, the son of the entrepreneur, who tries to commit suicide out of despair, without success. In the final scene, Nicole's friend greets commissioner before leaving Lucca and boards the train while the two promise each other that sooner or later they would meet again.

Cast
 Edwige Fenech as  Nicole Venturi 
 Ray Lovelock as  Inspector Stefano Avanza
  Manuel Bandera  as  Andrea Baresi 
  Victoria Vera  as Anna Selpi 
 Gudrun Landgrebe as Daniela Pierboni 
 Maja Maranow as  Milena Bolzoni 
 Lorenzo Flaherty as Paolo Roversi
 Joe Kloenne as Marco Pierboni 
 Annie Girardot as Ada Roversi
 Paolo Malco as  Massimo Pierboni 
 Cinzia De Ponti as Magistrate Castelli 
 Carlo Cartier as  Franco Martelli 
 Stefano Nosei   
 Davide Bechini as Filippo Pierboni  
 Silvia Mocci as Chiara Malvini 
 Néstor Garay as lawyer Portili   
 Carlo Monni as Paolo's father
 Giovanni Visentin   
 Vittoria Belvedere as Sandra Durani
 Laurent Terzieff as  Carlo Mauri 
 Jacques Perrin as Roberto Durani 
 Gabriele Ferzetti as Dr. Guido Braschi
 Alida Valli as Matilde Pierboni

External links

1993 Italian television series debuts
1993 Italian television series endings
Italian drama television series
1990s Italian television series
Films directed by Sergio Martino